Óscar Vega Sánchez (born June 27, 1965 in Vitoria-Gasteiz, Álava) is a former boxer from Spain, who represented his native country at the 1992 Summer Olympics in Barcelona, Spain. There he was eliminated in the first round of the bantamweight division (less than 54 kg) by Argentina's Remigio Molina on points (4:14).

External links
  Spanish Olympic Committee

1965 births
Living people
Bantamweight boxers
Boxers at the 1992 Summer Olympics
Olympic boxers of Spain
Spanish male boxers
Sportspeople from Vitoria-Gasteiz